Puri Puri or puripuri may refer to:

 Princess Princess (band), commonly known as Puri Puri, Japanese band
 Puripuri, the practice of sorcery in Papua New Guinea
 Puri-Puri Prisoner, a character in the Japanese manga One-Punch Man

See also
 Puri (disambiguation)